Vigneshwar is a 1991 Indian Tamil-language crime thriller film directed by R. Raghu, starring Karthik, Khushbu and Radha Ravi.  The film was released on 23 June 1991.

Cast 
Karthik as Vigneshwar IPS, Assistant Commissioner of Police
Khushbu as Ramya Rajendran
Radha Ravi as Amir Nath
Geetha as Padmini
Vijayakumar as DIG Rajendran
Delhi Ganesh as Vidhyasagar
Junior Balaiah as Stranger
Vasu Vikram
Kirish
V. K. Ramasamy in guest appearance

Soundtrack 
Soundtrack is composed by Sangeetha Rajan.
"O Ya" – S. P. Balasubrahmanyam
"Thannikinni" – K. S. Chithra
"Poonkathe" – K. S. Chithra

Reception 
The Indian Express wrote, "Vigneshwar is a crime thriller with the attendant cliches in tow the vendetta line [..] But the glitter and sheen of cinematic package [..] gives a beguiling manner to the film."

References

External links 
 

1990s Tamil-language films
1991 crime thriller films
1991 films
Films directed by R. Raghu
Indian crime thriller films